The  are a set of nonprofit organisations established to preserve and disseminate the work of 20th-century Indian philosopher Jiddu Krishnamurti (18951986). The foundations, established in the late-1960s to mid-1970s by Krishnamurti and associates, are located in India, Spain, the United Kingdom and the United States. They transcribe and distribute his thousands of talks, discussions and writings in various media formats and several languages; and maintain archives of original material covering Krishnamurti's almost eight-decade presence in the public stage. They also organize events exploring Krishnamurti's philosophy, and oversee independent schools that were formed to promote and apply his views on education.

Description
Jiddu Krishnamurti (1895–1986), whose life and teachings spanned the greater part of the 20th century, is regarded by many as one who has had the most profound impact on human consciousness in modern times. The foundations provide a service to those who may be interested in pursuing an understanding of the teachings in their own lives. The foundations maintain an extensive archive of Krishnamurti's original works in the form of hand-written material, books, transcripts and audio and video tapes of hundreds of talks and discussions, meetings and conversations. There is also a collection of Krishnamurti's letters, photographs and reference material about him, his life, and his works.

The foundations are also actively engaged in the publication of this material in various forms. Over 60 books are in print and more are in preparation. About 300 videotapes and 400 audio cassettes are available, along with an extensive printed Index. etc. An increasing amount of this material is being translated. Over 30 languages are available including all major European and most Indian languages as well as Japanese, Cantonese, Mandarin, Russian, Korean and Hebrew.

Foundations

 Krishnamurti Foundation Trust, Brockwood Park, Bramdean, England, United Kingdom
 Krishnamurti Foundation of America, Ojai, California, United States
 Krishnamurti Foundation India, Chennai, India
 Fundación Krishnamurti Latinoamericana, Barcelona, Spain

Educational philosophy
Education forms a central core of Krishnamurti's world view. In fact, Krishnamurti spent his entire life talking about education as being the agent not only of inner renewal but also of social change. Krishnamurti asserted that the schools functioning under the auspices of the Krishnamurti Foundation India (KFI), and others started independently by his supporters, did not exist as organizations for the indoctrination of children, but rather as places ‘where students and teachers can flower, and where a future generation can be prepared because schools are meant for that.

Krishnamurti supporters founded several schools around the world. When asked, Krishnamurti enumerated the following as his educational aims:
 Global outlook: A vision of the whole as distinct from the part; there should never be a sectarian outlook, but always a holistic outlook free from all prejudice.
 Concern for man and the environment: Humanity is part of nature, and if nature is not cared for, it will boomerang on man. Only the right education and deep affection between people everywhere will resolve many problems including the environmental challenges.
 Religious spirit, which includes the scientific temper: The religious mind is alone, not lonely. It is in communion with people and nature.

Foundation schools

 Brockwood Park School, United Kingdom
 Oak Grove School, United States
 Rishi Valley School, Madanapalle, Andra Pradesh, India
 Rajghat Besant School, Varanasi, India 
 The School KFI, Chennai, India
 Pathashaala KFI, Tamil Nadu, India
 The Valley School, Bengaluru, India
 Sahyadri School, Pune, India

Study centres

 Krishnamurti Study Centre, Brockwood Park, United Kingdom
 Pepper Tree Retreat, Ojai, California, United States
 Rajghat Education Center, Rajghat Fort, India
 The Study, Valley School Campus, Bangalore, Índia
 Krishnamurti Study Centre Sahyadri, Pune, India
 KFI Mumbai, India
 Krishnamurti Centre, Kolkata, India
 KFI Cuttack Centre, India
 Krishnamurti Retreat in the Himalayas, Uttarkashi, India
 Krishnamurti Center, Colombo 06, Sri Lanka
 Krishnamurti Study Center, Baddagana Road, Sri Jayawardenepura Kotte, Sri Lanka

References

External links
 J Krishnamurti Online
  Krishnamurti Foundation Trust
 Krishnamurti Foundation India
 Krishnamurti Foundation of America
 J Krishnamurti Centre
 Jiddu Krishnamurti International Centre
 Brockwood Park School
 Journal of the Krishnamurti Schools

Jiddu Krishnamurti
Year of establishment missing
Educational foundations